John Arthur Lanchbery OBE (15 May 1923 – 27 February 2003) was an English-Australian composer and conductor, famous for his ballet arrangements. He served as the Principal Conductor of the Royal Ballet from 1959 to 1972, Principal Conductor of the Australian Ballet from 1972 to 1977, and Musical Director of the American Ballet Theatre from 1978 to 1980. He continued to conduct regularly for the Royal Ballet until 2001.

Lanchbery was widely considered (including by Nureyev) to be the greatest ballet conductor of his time, and to be ‘a conductor and music director of unmatched experience’ who was ‘directly responsible for raising the status and the standards of musical performance'. Maina Gielgud, Artistic Director of Australian Ballet, stated that "He [Lanchbery] is not only the finest conductor for dance of his generation and probably well beyond". One critic wrote that ‘the music was always on its best behaviour’ when Lanchbery was conducting. He was also famous for his re-adaptation of canonical works.

Early life

Lanchbery was born in London on 15 May 1923, where he began violin lessons and music composition when he was eight years of age. He was educated at Alleyn's School, where he formed a collaborative partnership with Peter Stanley Lyons who was later a famous chorister, and with Kenneth Spring who was the founder of the National Youth Theatre and whose composer mother encouraged Lanchbery's musical talent. Lanchbery was in 1942 awarded the Henry Smart Composition Scholarship to the Royal Academy of Music, where he studied under Sir Henry Wood until his studies were interrupted by the war, during which he served in the Royal Armoured Corps, after which Lanchbery returned to the RAM to study for two more years before he returned to Alleyn's School as a music master. He was declined the job of Alleyn's School's Director of Music, and subsequently worked for a music publisher.

Musical career

Conductor of London Metropolitan Ballet and Sadler's Wells Theatre Ballet: 1948 – 1959
Lanchbery was recommended to apply for the post of Conductor of the Metropolitan Ballet. He obtained the position and made his debut with them at Edinburgh in 1948. Two years later the orchestra collapsed for lack of funds. However, working with choreographer Celia Franca, Lanchbery wrote The Eve of St Agnes (the story was based on John Keats' poem of the same name), one of the first commissioned ballets to be shown on BBC television. He composed film scores for Eric Robinson before joining the Sadler's Wells Theatre Ballet (later the Royal Ballet touring company) in 1951, with whom he proceeded to orchestrate, in 1953, the first professional ballet choreographed by Kenneth MacMillan: Somnambulism whose music was composed with music by Stan Kenton. Lanchbery also orchestrated  The House of Birds (La Casa de los Pájaros) in 1955, with original music by Federico Mompou.

Principal Conductor of Royal Ballet: 1959 – 1972
He served as Principal Conductor of the Royal Ballet from 1959 from 1972. He arranged La fille mal gardée (original music by Ferdinand Hérold and others), to choreography by Frederick Ashton, for the Royal Ballet in 1960. Lanchbery's re-working also included some Donizetti and much of his own invention. This work includes the famous Clog Dance used for many years as a theme tune for Home This Afternoon on BBC radio.

In addition to the revenue from his recordings, Lanchbery had his income supplemented by the copyright he earned from his orchestral arrangements, which were used by ballet companies all over the world. With Ashton, he composed The Two Pigeons; A Month in the Country; and The Dream, one of the most critically acclaimed ballet versions of A Midsummer Night's Dream.

In 1966 Rudolf Nureyev asked Lanchbery to re-write Ludwig Minkus's Don Quixote.

Although he resigned from the position of Director of the Royal Ballet in 1972, he continued to conduct regularly for the company until 2001.

Principal Conductor of Australian Ballet: 1972 – 1977
Notable successes for Lanchbery included the arrangement of the Liszt music for Kenneth MacMillan's stormy multi-act Mayerling, which premiered at Covent Garden in 1978, and the arrangement of the Franz Lehár score for the first full-length ballet production of The Merry Widow for the Australian Ballet in 1976.
In 1970 he arranged the score for the ballet film The Tales of Beatrix Potter. His sources were many and varied, including the operas of Michael William Balfe and Arthur Sullivan. He also arranged the music and conducted the orchestra for Nijinsky in 1980.

Lanchbery was the first to convert operas into ballets (The Tales of Hoffmann, The Merry Widow, Die Fledermaus), and he also wrote music for some British films of the 1950s, including Deadly Nightshade (1953) and Colonel March Investigates (1955). He was involved in The Turning Point (1977), starring Mikhail Baryshnikov and Leslie Browne, and his score for Evil Under the Sun (1982) was based on songs by Cole Porter, a memorable rendition of "You're The Top" by Diana Rigg. He also wrote scores for two silent film classics: D. W. Griffith's The Birth of a Nation and John Ford's The Iron Horse.

Director of American Ballet Theatre: 1978 – 1980
The American Ballet Theatre used 14 Lanchbery arrangements between 1962 and 2002: he was the Musical Director of the Company between 1978 and 2002. Their productions included his arrangement, for Natalia Makarova, Minkus's La Bayadère in 1980. Lanchbery arranged more than 30 pieces by Franz Liszt for Macmillan's Mayerling, which premiered at Covent Garden in 1978, and arranged another successful re-working of Minkus for Nureyev's production of La Bayadère in 1991. Nureyev considered Lanchbery to be the greatest conductor of his time, but critics who disliked innovation disliked Lanchbery's tampering with original scores.

Visiting conductor

In addition to London, Australia, and Sweden, Lanchbery was a guest conductor at many of the world's leading opera houses, including Paris, Stockholm, Rio de Janeiro, New York and Houston. He also toured Japan, Russia and China. He received honours from Russia and Sweden.

Honours
Lanchbery  was the first non-Soviet conductor to receive the Bolshoi Medal. He also received the Carina Ari Medal and the Queen Elizabeth II Coronation Award, Britain's highest professional award. In 1990 he was appointed an Officer of the Order of the British Empire.

Personal life
Lanchbery married a Sadler's Wells principal Elaine Fifield in 1951. They had a daughter, Margaret Lanchbery, and divorced in 1960: Elaine died in 1999. Lanchbery became an Australian citizen in 2002, making his home in Melbourne, where he died on 27 February 2003. He was survived by his daughter, Margaret, of Melbourne, and his companion, Thomas Han.

He was a member of the Garrick Club.

Works

Some of the most popular ballets are arrangements of works written for a different purpose. Perhaps the best-known is Alexander Glazunov's arrangement of Frédéric Chopin's piano music into the ballet Les Sylphides. Another famous example is La boutique fantasque, an arrangement of Gioachino Rossini's music by Ottorino Respighi in 1919. However, Lanchbery was the most successful and prolific arranger of music for ballet.

 Title – original composer
 Tales of Beatrix Potter – Michael William Balfe and others, but also included much original music by Lanchbery
 The Hunchback of Notre Dame – Hector Berlioz
 A Month in the Country – Frédéric Chopin
 Peer Gynt – Edvard Grieg (based on his Peer Gynt incidental music)
 La fille mal gardée – Ferdinand Hérold
 Somnambulism – Stan Kenton
 The Merry Widow – Franz Lehár
 Mayerling  – Franz Liszt
 Dracula – Liszt
 The Dream – Felix Mendelssohn
 Don Quixote – Ludwig Minkus
 La Bayadère – Minkus
 Grand Pas Classique from Paquita – Minkus
 House of Birds – Federico Mompou
 The Tales of Hoffmann – Jacques Offenbach
 Le Papillon – Offenbach
 Cleopatra – Nikolai Rimsky-Korsakov
 Monotones – Erik Satie
 Rosalinda – Johann Strauss II (based on Die Fledermaus)
 Designs with Strings – Pyotr Ilyich Tchaikovsky (based on his Piano Trio in A minor)
 The Snow Maiden – Tchaikovsky

Lanchbery's works included supporting tertiary students: during a 1976 visit to Australia, Lanchbery conducted the 27th Intervarsity Choral Festival choir performing Rossini's Petite messe solennelle and Gaudeamus igitur'' in Hobart.

Notes

References

External links
 

1923 births
2003 deaths
20th-century British composers
20th-century British conductors (music)
20th-century British male musicians
British ballet composers
British male conductors (music)
English composers
English male composers
English conductors (music)
British emigrants to Australia
Musicians from London
LGBT composers
LGBT classical musicians
English LGBT musicians
Alumni of the Royal Academy of Music
British Army personnel of World War II
Officers of the Order of the British Empire
Royal Armoured Corps soldiers
20th-century LGBT people